Helen Schnabel, née Fogel, (July 22, 1911 – September 29, 1974) was an American pianist. She was married to the pianist Karl Ulrich Schnabel.

Biography

Helen Fogel was born in New York and grew up in the Bronx. She made her debut at Carnegie Hall when she was nine. Over the next few years, she performed on radio and gave recitals in New York. When she was 21 she graduated from the Juilliard School, where her teachers included Manfred Malkin and Alexander Siloti.

Between 1934 and 1938 she studied under Artur Schnabel at Tremezzo, on Lake Como in Italy. There she met his son Karl Ulrich Schnabel, whom she married in 1939; their daughter Ann was born in 1941.

The couple started the four-hands ensemble Piano Duo Schnabel. They performed on radio and gave recitals in Canada and the United States and, after the end of the Second World War, in Europe. They gave five concerts with orchestra at the Holland Festival in 1956, played at the Edinburgh Festival in 1972 and, from 1948, taught master classes at Tremezzo in summer.

Helen Schnabel also performed as a soloist. From 1940, she taught at the Dalcroze School of Music in New York. She died of cancer at Lake Como in 1974.

Discography

Piano solo

Artur Schnabel: Concerto for Piano and Orchestra (Intermezzo and Rondo), F. Charles Adler, Conductor, Vienna Orchestra; Seven Piano Pieces; Reverie; Songs, Erika Francoulon, Soprano. Helen Schnabel Plays Artur Schnabel (CD: TownHall Records THCD-65)
Beethoven: Concerto for Piano and Orchestra, No. 6, Op. 61 — F. Charles Adler, Conductor, Vienna Orchestra; Weber: Sonata in E Minor, Op. 70, No. 4; Malipiero: Poemi Asolani. Helen Schnabel Plays Beethoven, Weber, and Malipiero (CD: TownHall Records THCD-66)
Bach, C.P.E.: Piano Concerto in D Major. Vienna Philharmonia Orchestra. F. Charles Adler, conductor. Trio for Flute, Violin and Piano. Camillo Wanausek, Flute; Walter Schneiderhahn, Violin; Helen Schnabel, Piano. (LP: SPA Records, SPA-37)
Beethoven: Concerto for Piano and Orchestra D Major, No. 6, Op. 61. Vienna Orchestra. F. Charles Adler, conductor. (LP: SPA Records, SPA-45)
Beethoven: Concerto for Piano and Orchestra, Op. 61A. Vienna Orchestra. F. Charles Adler, conductor. (CD: Somerset Recordings, SCD 10001)
Weber: Sonata in E Minor, Op. 70, No. 4. Malipiero: Poemi Asolani. (LP: SPA Records, SPA-15)
Schnabel, Artur: Seven Piano Pieces; Reverie. Piece in Seven Movemements. Dika Newlin, piano. (LP: SPA Records, SPA-13)
Schnabel, Artur: Concerto for Piano and Orchestra. Vienna Orchestra, F. Charles Adler, conductor. (LP: SPA Records, SPA-55)

with Karl Ulrich Schnabel, piano

Helen and Karl Ulrich Schnabel – One Piano, Four Hands; Mozart, Dvorak, Schubert, Weber, Bizet, Mendelssohn, Brahms. (CD: TownHall Records THCD19A-B)
Helen and Karl Ulrich Schnabel – The Four-Hand Recordings of the 1950s, Vol. 1. Bizet, Debussy, Schubert, Mozart. (CD: TownHall Records THCD76A-B)
Helen and Karl Ulrich Schnabel – The Four-Hand Recordings of the 1950s, Vol. 2. Mozart, Brahms, Schubert, Mendelssohn, Weber. (CD: TownHall Records THCD77A-B)
Schubert: Sonata in B Flat Major, Op. 30; Four Polonaises, D. 824. (LP: SPA 49)
Mendelssohn: Allegro brilliant; Andante and Variations. Weber: Five Pieces, Op. 10, No. 5 and Op. 60, Nos. 5, 6, 7 and 8. (LP: SPA 50)
Mozart: Concerto for Two Pianos in E Flat, K. 365; Concerto for Three Pianos in F, K. 242 (with Ilse von Alpenheim, piano). Vienna Symphony Orchestra, conducted by Bernhard Paumgartner. (LP: Epic LC 3259)
Mozart: Sonata in D Major, K. 448. Sonata in D Major, K. 381. Tema con variazioni in G Major, K. 501. (LP: Philips A 00326)
Schubert: Four Polonaises, D. 824. Debussy: Epigraphes antiques, Nos. 1, 2 and 4. (LP: Philips NBE 11004; Philips 402024 E)
Schubert: Eight Variations in A Flat, D. 813. Four Variations in B Flat, D. 603. Eight Variations in C, D. 908. (LP: Philips 06046 R)
Schubert: Fantasy in F. Minor, D. 940. Brahms: Hungarian Dances Nos. 4, 3, 2, 11, 1, 12, 13 and 17. (LP: Philips N 00255 L, Epic LC 3183)
Mozart: Sonata in C Major, K. 521. Dvorák: Legend Op. 59, No. 4. Schubert: Fantasy in F Minor, Op. 103. Weber: Rondo and Adagio. Schubert: Sonata in B Flat Major, Op. 30. Mozart: Andante with Variations in G Major, K. 501. Bizet: Five Pieces from “Jeux d’enfants,” Op. 22. Mendelssohn: Andante tranquillo with Variations, Op. 83a. Brahms: Two Hungarian Dances. (LP: Sheffield/Town Hall, Album S-19, ACM158A-B, ACM159A-B)

with Artur Schnabel, Therese Behr Schnabel, and Karl Ulrich Schnabel

The Schnabels – A Musical Legacy, Unpublished and Lost Historic Recordings. Mozart, Schumann, Schubert, C.P.E. Bach, J.S. Bach, Mendelssohn, Paradisi. (CD: TownHall Records THCD74A-B)

References

1911 births
1974 deaths
American classical pianists
Classical piano duos
American women classical pianists
20th-century classical pianists
20th-century American pianists
20th-century American women pianists
Deaths from cancer in Lombardy
Musicians from the Bronx
Classical musicians from New York (state)